There have been 22 head coaches for the East Carolina Pirates.  East Carolina started organized football with the nickname Teachers, in 1932.  The school changed the nickname to the Pirates on February 26, 1934.

East Carolina has played in more than 800 games in a total of 84 seasons, 42 of which are in Division I-A. In those games, seven coaches have brought the Pirates to bowl games: Jack Boone in 1952 and 1954, Clarence Stasavich in 1963, 1964 and 1965, Pat Dye in 1978, Bill Lewis in 1991, Steve Logan in 1994, 1995, 1999, 2000 and 2001, Skip Holtz in 2006, 2007, 2008 and 2009, and Ruffin McNeill in 2010, 2012, 2013 and 2014.  Five coaches have won conference championships with the Pirates: Jack Boone in 1953, Clarence Stasavich in 1966, Sonny Randle in 1972 and 1973, Pat Dye in 1976, and Skip Holtz in 2008 and 2009.  Steve Logan is the all-time leader in games coached, years coached, and wins, while John Christenbury leads all coaches in winning percentage with 0.867. O. A. Hankner is statistically the worst coach the Pirates have had in terms of winning percentage, with .000.

Of the 22 Pirate coaches, Mike McGee and Pat Dye have been inducted to the College Football Hall of Fame.  Two coaches, Clarence Stasavich and Bill Lewis, have received National Coach of the Year honors. Three former players have been head coach for the Pirates: Jim Johnson, Ed Emory and Ruffin McNeill. In addition, former players have become Pirate assistant coaches, such as Junior Smith and Paul Troth. The current coach is Mike Houston. Statistics correct as of December 3, 2021, after the end of the 2021–22 college football season.  East Carolina changed from East Carolina Teachers College to East Carolina College in 1951 and to East Carolina University in 1967.

Key

Coaches

References 
General
 
 
† The defensive coordinator appointed interim football coach to finish out 2018 year.
Specific

Lists of college football head coaches

North Carolina sports-related lists